Robert Wiens (born 1953 in Leamington, Ontario) is a Canadian visual artist.

Biography 

Robert Wiens was born in Leamington, Ontario in 1953, and currently lives in Picton, Ontario. He attended the New School of Art from 1973 to 1974, and had his first solo exhibition at Mercer Union in Toronto in 1980. Wiens’ paintings and sculptures have been exhibited internationally. Recent exhibitions include Do Not Destroy: Trees, Art and Jewish Thought at The Contemporary Jewish Museum, San Francisco; Micro/Macro at Gallery Stratford, Stratford, Ontario and Doris McCarthy Gallery, Toronto;  and Speak for the Trees, organized by Friesen Gallery in Seattle, Washington and Sun Valley, Idaho.  Wiens has completed commissioned sculptures for the Open Corridor Festival in Windsor, Ontario and for the Forest Art Project in Haliburton, Ontario.  His work is held in public collections, including the National Gallery of Canada, Ottawa; Agnes Etherington Art Centre, Kingston; Four Seasons Hotel, Tokyo; Art Gallery of Ontario, Toronto, and Doris McCarthy Gallery, Toronto.

Work 

Wiens’ early work consisted of large-scale sculptures and installations, depicting fragments of heroic monuments. He used sculpture and installation to explore social issues and ideas of language and representation. He is perhaps best known for his large-scale watercolour close-ups of pine trees, which he began painting in 1996. The watercolours are detailed portraits of trees, including old-growth pines in Temagami, Ontario, and deciduous trees found in his local area. Wiens photographs the trees and then painstakingly reproduces their texture, colour and scale. The renderings are extremely detailed and dense. Wiens’ tree portraits also function as memorials to, or remnants of the destruction of Canadian forests. As John Armstong writes in C Magazine, "Wiens creates, in his pinpoint framing and cool description, a chilly distance between the living trees and what we see in the gallery: he gestures both romance and the deadpan optics of a ledger. Without any didactic tone, these paintings chronicle a simultaneously grim and poetic politic."

References

Further reading 

Dault, Gary Michael. Robert Wiens, Carmen Lamanna Gallery. Canadian Art, vol.4, no.1(Spring 1987);

Fleming, Martha. Robert Wiens, Mercer Union. Vanguard, vol.9, no.8(October 1980);

Gopnik, Blake. Eclectic, electric and eccentric. The Globe and Mail, 24 July 1999;

Hansen, Michael, 2010-2011 Season: ArtSync. Toronto, Ontario: blurb.com, 2011;

Mays, John Bentley. The flowering of a creative discontent. The Globe and Mail, 17 March 1984;

Moore, Christopher. Wiens takes us behind the scenes in the theatre of war. The Queen's Journal, #32, vol.123;

Milroy, Sarah. Art grows in a forest. The Globe and Mail, 6 September 2002;

Randolph, Jeanne. Robert Wiens, YYZ. Vanguard, vol.12, no.3 (April 1983);

Reid, Stuart. Robert Wiens. Lola, no.6, Summer 2000;

Rhodes, Richard. Toronto, Robert Wiens. ArtForum, March 1987;

Glam North - Doris McCarthy and her Contemporaries. Doris McCarthy Gallery, University of Toronto Scarborough, 2014.

1953 births
20th-century Canadian painters
Artists from Ontario
Living people
People from Leamington, Ontario
21st-century Canadian painters
20th-century Canadian male artists
21st-century Canadian male artists
Canadian male painters
20th-century Canadian sculptors
21st-century Canadian sculptors
Canadian male sculptors